Colne Bridge Mill was a factory, built in 1775, in the village of Colne Bridge near Bradley and Kirkheaton, Huddersfield, West Yorkshire, England, which was destroyed by fire on 14 February 1818. It was owned by the wealthy manufacturer Thomas Atkinson (1779–1838), who was also proprietor of another business at Bradley Mills, Huddersfield.

Fire of 1818 

Early in the morning of 14 February 1818, around 5 am, the fire was caused by a 10-year-old boy, James Thornton, who was sent down into the Mill’s carding room with a naked candle. The flame ignited the huge amounts of flammable material. Many were left trapped in the mill's upper floors. As the workers tried to escape and attempts were made to rescue them, the mill's floors and roof collapsed.

Twenty-six women and girls (aged between 9 and 18) were working through the night and of these 17 were killed and only 8 survived. The inquest found that the deaths were accidental, and no one was ever prosecuted. The bodies were in such a mutilated state that they were unidentifiable, and the 15 bodies recovered were buried in a communal grave at Kirkheaton Parish Church on 16 February 1818.

Impact and memorial 
The tragedy led to further questions about factory conditions being raised in Parliament; and it thereby contributed to the movement for improving working conditions. Nine days after the fire, Sir Robert Peel the Elder moved the second reading of his Factory Bill in the House of Commons to prevent recurrence of ‘that which has lately taken place at Colne Bridge’. The Bill was later enacted as the Cotton Mills and Factories Act 1819.

Three years later, in 1821, a memorial to the victims of the fire was erected, by voluntary subscription, and stands in Kirkheaton Chuchyard. It was restored in 1986 to mark the centenary of the Trades Union Congress.

In 2018, varied events were held to commemorate the tragedy's bicentenary, including a memorial service at Kirkheaton Parish Church on 10 February 2018, and a plaque was unveiled in remembrance of those lives lost.

References 

Building and structure fires in England
Huddersfield
1818 in England
Disasters in Yorkshire
February 1818 events
Factory fires
Building collapses in the United Kingdom
Building collapses caused by fire